or the  is mountain range surrounding the Romsdalen valley in Møre og Romsdal county, Norway. They are primarily located in Rauma Municipality, Molde Municipality, and Fjord Municipality. The southern part of the mountain range is also located within Reinheimen National Park. The famous Trollstigen road runs over a pass in this mountain range.

Mountains in the range include:
 Store Venjetind at 
 Trollryggen at 
 Romsdalshorn at 
 Kyrkjetaket at

See also
List of mountains of Norway

References

Mountain ranges of Norway
Landforms of Møre og Romsdal
Rauma, Norway
Molde
Fjord (municipality)